Mevlüt Han Ekelik (born 16 December 2004) is a Turkish professional footballer who plays as a midfielder for Antalyaspor.

Professional career
Ekelik made his professional debut with Antalyaspor in a 2-2 Süper Lig tie with Galatasaray on 24 July 2020, at the age of 15. In doing so, he became the fourth youngest debutant in the history of the Süper Lig.

References

External links
 
 
 

2004 births
Living people
Sportspeople from Antalya
Turkish footballers
Turkey youth international footballers
Antalyaspor footballers
Süper Lig players
Association football midfielders